The 2019–20 season was the 16th season in the history of the Scarlets, a Welsh regional rugby union side based in Llanelli, Carmarthenshire. They competed in the Pro14 and, having failed the previous season to qualify for the Champions Cup for the first time in their history, the Challenge Cup. 

It was the team's first and only season under head coach Brad Mooar, who was assisted by defence coach Glenn Delaney and assistant attack coach Richard Whiffin, after Wayne Pivac departed to take charge of the Wales national team. On the 24th of December 2019, it was announced that Mooar would leave the Scarlets at the end of the season to join the New Zealand All Blacks' coaching team.

On 12 March 2020, the season was indefinitely suspended due to the COVID-19 pandemic. The regular season resumed on 22 August 2020, with the number of rounds reduced from 21 to 15 and any games postponed prior to the indefinite suspension of the season being deemed as 0–0 draws and both teams awarded two points. Rounds 14 and 15 took place as derbies for each Welsh region, with the top two teams in each conference progressing to the semi-final stage. Delaney was appointed as head coach after Mooar's departure and took charge of the games in August and September 2020.

Pre-season and friendlies

Pro14

Fixtures

Table
Conference B

Rugby Challenge Cup

Pool stage

Fixtures

Table

Knockout stage

Statistics
(+ in the Apps column denotes substitute appearance, positions listed are the ones they have started a game in during the season)

Stats correct as of 19 September 2020

Transfers

In

Out

Notes

References 

2019-20
2019–20 Pro14 by team
2019–20 in Welsh rugby union
2019–20 European Rugby Challenge Cup by team